Barbara Radecki is a Canadian actress who has performed several roles for television shows, movies, and has voiced several animated roles, most notably the voice of Sailor Neptune in the English version of Sailor Moon S. She had appeared in several earlier episodes as Ikuko Tsukino and Queen Serenity as well. She is married to Philippe Ayoub and has two children. She is also a screen play writer and young adult novel writer.

Filmography

Film

Television

References

External links

Canadian film actresses
Canadian television actresses
Canadian voice actresses
Living people
20th-century Canadian actresses
21st-century Canadian actresses
Year of birth missing (living people)
Place of birth missing (living people)